"Bric à brac" is a song by French singer Priscilla from her fourth album Bric à brac. It was the album's opening track and it was released as its first single. The single came out simultaneously with the album on June 27, 2005, and reached number 31 in France.

Track listing

Charts

References 

2005 songs
2005 singles
Priscilla Betti songs
Jive Records singles
Songs written by Philippe Osman
Songs written by Bertrand Châtenet